These are the results of the Women's lightweight double sculls competition, one of six events for female competitors in Rowing at the 2004 Summer Olympics in Athens. The Rowing events were held at the Schinias Olympic Rowing and Canoeing Centre.

Medalists

Heats - 15 August

Heat 1

Heat 2

Heat 3

Repechage - 17 August

Repechage 1

Repechage 2

Repechage 3

Semifinal A/B - 19 August

Semifinal 1

Semifinal 2

Final - 21 August

Final C

Final B

Final A

References

External links
Official Olympic Report

Women's Lwt Double Sculls
Women's Lwt Double Sculls
Women's events at the 2004 Summer Olympics